Giovanni Carlo is a blended masculine given name that combines Giovanni and Carlo that is often shortened to Gian Carlo, Giancarlo, or Gian-Carlo. Notable people with this name include the following:

Giovanni Carlo Aliberti, (1670 - 1727), Italian painter
Giovanni Carlo Antonelli (1612 – 1694), Italian Roman Catholic prelate
Giovanni Carlo Bandi (1709 – 1784), Italian Cardinal
Giovanni Carlo Bevilacqua (1775 – 1849), Italian painter
Giovanni Carlo Boschi (1715 – 1788), Italian clergyman
Giovanni Carlo Coppola (?? – 1606), Italian Roman Catholic prelate
Giovanni Carlo Doria (1576-1625), Italian art collector
Giovanni Carlo Galli-Bibiena (1717 - 1760), Italian architect and designer
Giovanni Carlo Maria Clari (1677 – 1754), Italian musical composer and maestro di cappella
Giovanni Carlo Tramontano, Count of Matera (1451 – 1514), Italian nobleman

See also